Nalik culture is the traditional culture of the Nalik people of northern New Ireland in Papua New Guinea.  The Nalik language is spoken by approximately 5000 people, based in 14 villages on the east coast of New Ireland, and 3 on the west coast. A significant number of Nalik speakers live outside the language area, in Kavieng, Port Moresby and elsewhere.

Nalik society has a rich, complex and active traditional culture.  Most famously, it features malagan ceremonies, and indeed malagan is a Nalik word.

Papua New Guinean culture

References